Lori Monk (born March 20, 1956) is an American speed skater. She competed in the women's 500 metres at the 1976 Winter Olympics.

References

External links
 

1956 births
Living people
American female speed skaters
Olympic speed skaters of the United States
Speed skaters at the 1976 Winter Olympics
Sportspeople from Madison, Wisconsin
21st-century American women